Euxoa clauda is a moth of the family Noctuidae. It is found in Asia, including Turkmenistan.

External links
Catalogue of Noctuidae, part 1, Robert W. Poole

Euxoa
Moths described in 1906